Kellen Christopher Moore (born July 5, 1988) is an American professional football coach and former player who is the offensive  coordinator for the Los Angeles Chargers of the National Football League (NFL). He played as a quarterback for six seasons in the NFL for the Dallas Cowboys and Detroit Lions. Moore played college football at Boise State University, where he set the FBS record for quarterback wins. Signed by Detroit as an undrafted free agent in 2012, he was a member of the Lions and Cowboys for three seasons each. He rejoined Dallas as a coach following his retirement and served as the team's offensive coordinator from 2019 through the 2022 NFL season. Following his departure from the Cowboys, Moore joined the Chargers staff as their offensive coordinator in 2023.

Early life 
Kellen Christopher Moore was born on July 5, 1988, in Prosser, Washington. His father, Tom, was the head coach at Prosser High School from 1986 to 2008, winning 21 league titles and four state championships. Every day during football season, he and younger brother, Kirby, who also played at Boise State as a wide receiver, went from the elementary school to their dad's football practice. As his father remembered in a 2011 interview, "He'd always have a little notepad with him. He was always drawing plays." In his final two years of high school, his father let him call his own plays.

His lack of height proved no obstacle to success at Prosser High. Moore was named the Gatorade Player of the Year for the state of Washington. He lettered in football and basketball three times each and was named Velocity/Prep Star All-American and First-team All-state, and Division 2A MVP by the Seattle Times. He earned league player of the year honors as well as First-team All-league recognition as a sophomore, junior and senior. He was also Third-team All-state selection as a junior.

He set Washington state career records for completions (787) and touchdown passes (173). He also set state single-season records for completions (317 as a junior), yards (4,600 as a junior) and touchdown passes (67 as a senior).

He finished his career completing 787 of 1,195 passes (.659) for 11,367 yards and 173 touchdowns with 34 interceptions. He led Prosser to a 12–1 record in 2006 as a senior and a spot in the state semifinals, in a loss to the Centralia Tigers that included two interceptions. As a junior, he completed 317-of-479 passes (66.2 percent) for 4,600 yards and 66 touchdowns with 15 interceptions. The year before, as a sophomore, he completed 179-of-308 passes (58.1-percent) for 2,442 yards and 39 touchdowns with 11 interceptions.

Moore's teammates at Boise State included his younger brother Kirby and childhood friend Cory Yriarte, a center for the Broncos. Kirby currently holds the national high school record for career touchdown receptions, with 95.

College career

2007 
During the 2007 season, Moore was redshirted.

2008 

As a redshirt freshman in 2008, Moore led the Broncos to an undefeated regular season and the WAC championship while throwing 25 touchdowns and 9 interceptions in 12 games. In the final game of 2008, Boise State lost to Texas Christian University (TCU) in the 2008 Poinsettia Bowl, the first of two consecutive bowl meetings for the non-Automatic Qualifying rivals. He was named WAC Freshman of the Year and Second-team All-conference after a spectacular first season, guiding Boise State to 12–1 record and was named Boise State's Most Valuable Offensive Player by vote of teammates. He was named to Phil Steele Publications' Second-team All-WAC and also voted to the Football Writers Association of America's freshman All-America team.

He ranked 12th in nation in passing efficiency and 24th in total offense, averaging 265.85 yards per game and was first in WAC in passing efficiency (157.1) and second in total offense (265.8) and average passing yards per game (268.2). He completed 281 of 405 passes for 3,486 yards with 25 touchdowns and 10 interceptions.

2009 

In January 2009, Moore was ranked as the 37th best returning player in college football by College Football News.

Moore threw for a school record 39 touchdowns with only 3 interceptions to lead the Broncos to a 14–0 record, another WAC title, and an at large bid to the Fiesta Bowl vs. undefeated #4 ranked TCU. The 2009 Fiesta Bowl was highly controversial due to the decision to pit the two non-Automatic Qualifying schools against each other instead of having them face Automatic Qualifying teams. The BCS was criticized for the perception that the risk of both, or either, team defeating a "power conference" team was too great, and that the BCS had TCU and BSU face each other so that the damage of their participation would be minimized. He finished the 2009 regular season with the highest passer efficiency rating in Division I-A with a rating of 167.3. In his first two years as a starting quarterback, Moore did not lose a regular season game.

Moore started against widely favored TCU and played the entire game. He had no interceptions, fumbles, or muffed snaps. He led the team on a 4th quarter 78-yard touchdown scoring drive to take the lead for good and win the game 17–10.

He was named First-team All-American by CBSSportsline.com, a subsidiary of CBS Sports. He was named one of ten finalists for the Manning Award.  He was also First-team All-WAC and the WAC Offensive Player of the Year in 2009 and finished 7th in Heisman voting for 2009.

2010 

Moore led the Broncos to a 33–30 victory over Virginia Tech on September 6, 2010. The game was highly anticipated and received a 6.8 TV rating, nearly twice that of the next most watched game. Moore contributed 3 passing touchdowns in the game with a final game-winning strike to Austin Pettis with 1:14 remaining in the game. As a result of the victory, Boise State received 8 first place votes in the week 2 AP Poll, and it moved up to third in the Coaches' Poll. Moore was also mentioned by major sports media as a top candidate for the 2010 Heisman Trophy. After finishing the season with 3,506 yards, 33 TDs and only 5 INTs, Moore was named a finalist for the Heisman Trophy and was invited to the ceremony in New York City to become the first ever Boise State player to be a Heisman finalist. Moore finished fourth in Heisman voting. Moore was also a finalist for the Davey O'Brien Award, the Maxwell Award, and the Manning Award (all won by Cam Newton). Moore was named the Touchdown Club of Columbus Quarterback of the Year. Boise State was invited to the 2010 Maaco Bowl Las Vegas, where they defeated Utah 26–3.

2011 

On March 28, 2011, the Sporting News named Moore as the #1 player in their annual list of the top 25 players in the nation. He was ranked ahead of Stanford quarterback Andrew Luck and Oregon running back LaMichael James who both finished ahead of Moore in the 2010 Heisman voting. He only needed 8 wins during the 2011 season to pass Colt McCoy for most wins by a quarterback in NCAA history. He threw his 100th touchdown pass against Georgia during week one. Following an opening season win against Georgia in the Chick-fil-A Kickoff Game, Moore was featured on the cover of Sports Illustrated, distributed only in the west.

With the Broncos defeat of Air Force on October 22, he tied former Texas quarterback Colt McCoy for the career wins record with 45 wins. On November 5, the Broncos defeated UNLV and Moore broke the record to become the FBS leader in career wins for a starting quarterback at 46. A perfect season, however, was spoiled again by a 36–35 loss to TCU.

He was one of three finalists for the Maxwell Award along with Andrew Luck and Trent Richardson (won by Luck). For the second year in a row, he was named the Touchdown Club of Columbus Quarterback of the Year and it was announced that beginning in 2012 the award will be known as the Kellen Moore Award. He ended 2011 ranked first in the FBS in completion percentage. With the Broncos' 56–24 win over Arizona State in the 2011 Maaco Bowl Las Vegas, Moore became the first quarterback in FBS history to win 50 games in his career.

Collegiate statistics

Professional playing career

He was projected as a late draft pick or priority free agent.

Detroit Lions 
He was not selected in the 2012 NFL Draft, but was signed immediately post-draft by the Detroit Lions. Upon being signed by Detroit, Moore stated, "I don't think there will probably be a more motivated quarterback." While some within the media voiced an opinion that Moore should unseat the newly signed Dan Orlovsky as the Lions primary backup during the 2014 season, Lions head coach Jim Caldwell decided Orlovsky would remain the incumbent. On February 21, 2014, it was announced the Lions would not place a restricted free agent tender offer on Moore, allowing him to explore other NFL options. Despite not tendering an offer, Lions General Manager Martin Mayhew expressed an interest in bringing Moore back for the 2015 season. On March 6, 2015, the Lions signed Moore to a two-year contract worth $1.825 million. On September 5, 2015, following the team's preseason, Moore failed to make the initial 53-player roster and was released during the team's final cuts of training camp.

Dallas Cowboys 
On September 6, 2015, Moore was signed by the Dallas Cowboys to the team's practice squad, reuniting with former Lions offensive coordinator Scott Linehan. After Tony Romo first fractured his left collarbone, he was promoted to the active roster to serve as Brandon Weeden's backup on September 23. He was the team's backup for two games, until the Cowboys acquired quarterback Matt Cassel. On November 10, he was waived and re-signed two days later to the practice squad.

After Romo suffered a second fracture of the collarbone on a Thanksgiving loss against the Carolina Panthers, Moore was promoted to the active roster on December 2, to serve as Cassel's backup. During Romo's absence, the Cowboys tried relying on backup quarterbacks Weeden (0–3) and Cassel (1–6), but weren't successful.

On December 19, Moore played in his first career regular season game against the New York Jets, replacing an ineffective Cassel. Moore's second career NFL pass was intercepted by Marcus Gilchrist. On the next drive, Moore threw his first career touchdown, connecting with Dez Bryant. He was intercepted two more times in the second half, including once in the end zone, when the Cowboys had a chance to go ahead 17–9 in the third quarter.

The loss against the Jets officially eliminated the Cowboys from playoff contention, so the organization decided to use the last two games to audition Moore. His first career start came the following week against the Buffalo Bills, completing 13 of 31 passes and throwing a third quarter interception to AJ Tarpley as the Cowboys lost 16–6.

In his first home start, playing against the Washington Redskins, he threw for 435 yards, 3 touchdowns, and 2 interceptions in a 34–23 loss. He became the fifth quarterback in team history to throw for 400 or more yards in a single game and also passed for the sixth-most yards in team history for a single game.

In 2016, he suffered a fractured fibula on his right leg during a training camp practice on August 2 and was placed on injured reserve on August 30.

On March 20, 2017, Moore re-signed with the Cowboys. He was released by the Cowboys on September 2, 2017, but was re-signed on September 5, 2017. He was released on October 26, 2017 and re-signed to the practice squad. In 2018, Moore retired from the NFL.

Following his retirement, Moore was the last left-handed quarterback to play in the NFL until Tua Tagovailoa in 2020.

NFL career statistics

Coaching career

Dallas Cowboys 
In 2018, after retiring from the NFL, he became the Cowboys' quarterbacks coach after the Cowboys long time coach Wade Wilson retired. On January 31, 2019, the Cowboys announced that Moore would be promoted to offensive coordinator. Following Jason Garrett's release as Cowboys' head coach after 10 seasons, FOX NFL insider Jay Glazer reported new coach Mike McCarthy had expressed interest to keep Moore on the coaching staff, which McCarthy did.

On January 29, 2023 after their 2022-2023 playoff exit, the Cowboys and Moore mutually agreed to part ways.

Los Angeles Chargers 
On January 30, 2023, Moore was hired by the Los Angeles Chargers to become their new offensive coordinator.

See also
 List of NCAA Division I FBS quarterbacks with at least 10,000 career passing yards
 List of NCAA Division I FBS quarterbacks with at least 80 career passing touchdowns
 List of NCAA major college football yearly passing leaders

References

External links

  
 
 

1988 births
Living people
American football quarterbacks
Boise State Broncos football players
Detroit Lions players
Dallas Cowboys coaches
Dallas Cowboys players
Los Angeles Chargers coaches
National Football League offensive coordinators
People from Prosser, Washington
Players of American football from Washington (state)